Abigail E. "Abbi" Fisher-Gould (born August 30, 1957) is a former World Cup alpine ski racer from the United States.  Born in South Conway, New Hampshire,  she had one World Cup victory and three podiums. She suffered a knee injury in March 1979, at the pre-Olympic downhill at Lake Placid.

Fisher competed in the Winter Olympics in 1976 and 1980. She was unable to start in the slalom at the World Championships in 1978 due to an ankle injury. and was also named to the U.S. team in 1982.

Fisher married Frank Gould; they have two children and reside in the Sun Valley area in central Idaho.

World Cup results

Race podiums
 1 victory – (1 SL) 
 3 podiums – (1 SL, 2 GS)

Season standings

References

External links
 
 Abbi Fisher World Cup standings at the International Ski Federation
 
 

1957 births
Living people
American female alpine skiers
Olympic alpine skiers of the United States
Alpine skiers at the 1976 Winter Olympics
Alpine skiers at the 1980 Winter Olympics
People from Conway, New Hampshire
Sportspeople from Carroll County, New Hampshire
21st-century American women